2010 Ulster Grand Prix races were held on the Dundrod Circuit between 9–14 August 2010 in County Antrim, Northern Ireland.

Practice Times

Practice Times & Leaderboard UGP Superbike Class

Race results

Race 1; 2010 1000cc Superstock race final standings
Saturday 14 August 2010 5 laps – 37.005 miles (Reduced Race Distance) Dundrod Circuit

Fastest Lap and new lap record: Ian Hutchinson, 3' 21.599 131.599 mph on lap 4

Race 2; 2010 600cc Supersport race final standings
Saturday 14 August 2010 6 laps – 44.406 miles Dundrod Circuit

Fastest Lap: Michael Dunlop, 3' 27.187 128.599 mph on lap 6

Race 3a; 2010 250cc Combined Race final standings
Saturday 14 August 2010 6 laps – 44.406 miles Dundrod Circuit

Fastest Lap: Ian Lougher, 3' 41.807 120.122 mph on lap 3

Race 4; 2010 1000cc Superbike Race 1 final standings
Saturday 14 August 2010 6 laps – 44.406 miles Dundrod Circuit

Fastest Lap: Keith Amor, 3' 20.016 133.209 mph on lap 5

Race 5; 2010 600cc Supersport race 2 final standings (Combined Result)
Saturday 14 August 2010 6 laps – 44.406 miles Dundrod Circuit

Fastest Lap: Ian Hutchinson, 3' 079 128.047 mph on lap 3 – Part 1

Race 6; 2010 1000cc Superbike Race 2 final standings
Saturday 14 August 2010 5 laps – 37.005 miles Dundrod Circuit

Fastest Lap and New Outright Course Record: Bruce Anstey, 3' 18.870 133.977 mph on lap 5

See also
 North West 200
 Isle of Man TT
 Manx Grand Prix

References

External links
 Official website

2010
Ulster
Ulster Grand Prix
August 2010 sports events in the United Kingdom